Morey House is a historic apartment house located at South Bend, St. Joseph County, Indiana. It was built in 1909, and is a large -story, building with a brick first story and stuccoed upper stories in an American Craftsman vernacular style. It has an irregular plan and features two small square porches with balconies on the corners of the front facade.

It was listed on the National Register of Historic Places in 1985.

References

Residential buildings on the National Register of Historic Places in Indiana
Houses completed in 1909
Buildings and structures in South Bend, Indiana
National Register of Historic Places in St. Joseph County, Indiana